Lassul Baining Rural LLG is a local-level government (LLG) of East New Britain Province, Papua New Guinea.

Wards
01. Poniar/Kanako
02. Mobilum
03. Takis
04. Nangasn
05. Traiwara
06. Lassul
07. Puktas
08. Karo
09. Matanakunai
10. Mandrambit (Simbali language speakers)
11. Wilambemki/Poiniara
12. Panarupkap
13. Laan
14. Yalom
15. Komgi
16. Naviu/Mamapit
17. Open Bay Timbers
18. Walmetki (Qaqet speakers)
19. Kolopom Settlement
20. Warakindam
21. Morokindam
22. Mobisberg Plantation

References

Local-level governments of East New Britain Province